Jack Hartigan (12 July 1928 – 25 October 1986) was an  Australian rules footballer who played with Hawthorn and St Kilda in the Victorian Football League (VFL).

Notes

External links 

1928 births
1986 deaths
Australian rules footballers from Victoria (Australia)
Hawthorn Football Club players
St Kilda Football Club players
Horsham Football Club players